52nd Regiment may refer to:

 52nd (London) Heavy Anti-Aircraft Regiment, Royal Artillery
 52nd Air Defense Artillery Regiment
 52nd Armoured Regiment (India)
 52nd Artillery Regiment "Torino"
 52nd Aviation Regiment (United States)
 52nd Illinois Infantry Regiment
 52nd Indiana Infantry Regiment
 52nd Infantry Regiment (United States)
 52nd Lowland Volunteers
 52nd Ohio Infantry
 52nd Pennsylvania Infantry Regiment
 52nd Regiment Kentucky Volunteer Mounted Infantry
 52nd Tennessee Infantry Regiment

See also
 52nd Division (disambiguation)